Turquoise is a solo album by Devon Allman, released in February, 2013. It features Yonrico Scott on drums (Allman's band-mate in Royal Southern Brotherhood) and Myles Weeks on bass, and includes guest musicians Luther Dickinson (guitar), Samantha Fish (vocals), Ron Holloway (saxophone) and Rick Steff (keyboard).

Recording, production 
In September 2012, Allman finished recording sessions for his first solo album. The sessions were recorded at Bessie Blue Studio and Ardent Studios, in Memphis, Tennessee, engineered by Pete Matthews and produced and mixed by Jim Gaines. Ron Holloway, who contributes saxophone on the song "Into the Darkness", also made a guest appearance on Allman's 2010 Honeytribe album, Space Age Blues.

The material on Turquoise is highly-personal and reflects Allman's life on the road over the past decade. There are ten original songs, including two tunes co-written with Royal Southern Brotherhood band-mate Mike Zito. Songs "Homesick" and "When I Left Home" are autobiographical tales. "These songs are very special to me," says Allman in a press release for Turquoise. "It's part 'dusty road driving music' and part 'tropical getaway' music. These are the stories, feelings and reflections from my last couple of decades of forging my musical path."

Track listing 
All music and lyrics written by Devon Allman, except where noted.

Personnel 
Devon Allman - vocals and guitars
Yonrico Scott - drums and percussion
Myles Weeks - electric bass and upright bass
Additional artists
Luther Dickinson - lead and slide guitars on "When I Left Home"
Samantha Fish - vocals on "Stop Draggin' My Heart Around"
Ron Holloway - saxophone on "Into the Darkness"
Bobby Schneck Jr. - lead guitar on "Strategy"
Rick Steff - Hammond B3 on "There's No Time", "Stop Draggin' My Heart Around", "Don't Set Me Free", and "Homesick"
Pete Matthews, Rueben Williams, Samantha Fish, Adam Hill - background vocals on "Don't Set Me Free"

Charts 
Turquoise peaked at #5 on Billboard's Blues Albums the week of March 2, 2013.

References

External links 
 Devon Allman Band

2013 albums
Devon Allman albums